Ed Rose (née Edward Smackels Jr.; 24 November 1875 Chicago — 29 April 1935 Evanston, Illinois), was an American lyricist who wrote the words to Oh Johnny, Oh Johnny, Oh! composed in 1917 by Abe Olman.

Rose & Snyder Co. Incorporated 
In 1906, George M. Krey (a music publisher from Boston), Ted Snyder, and Ed Rose formed the music publishing company, Rose & Snyder Co., located in Tin Pan Alley.  In May 1908, the firm was incorporated in the state of New York.  The directors were Edward Smackels, George M. Krey, and Maurice H. Rosenzweig, an entertainment lawyer.  That same month (May 1908), Ed Snyder severed his affiliation with Ed Rose and Ted Snyder. And, in June 1909, Ted Snyder severed his connection with the firm to form his own music publishing company, the Ted Snyder Company, which evolved into Waterson, Berlin & Snyder, Inc., in 1918. In 1909, composer Thomas Lemonier (1870–1945) joined the staff of Rose & Snyder.

Selected works 

F.A. Mills, 48 West 29 Street, New York City
 There Must Be Somethin' the Matter with Me, lyrics by Rose, music by Ted Snyder (1904) 
 The Man in the Moon Was Wise, lyrics by Rose, music by Ted Snyder (1904) 
 The Goblin Man, lyrics by Rose, music by Ted Snyder (1904) 
 Here's My Friend, lyrics by Rose, music by Ted Snyder (1904) 
 Heinie, lyrics by Rose, music by Ted Snyder (1904) 
 I Wonder If You Miss Me as I Miss You, lyrics by Rose, music by Ted Snyder (1904) 
 Nothin' From Nothin' Leaves You, lyrics by Rose, music by Ted Snyder (1905) 
 Don't Notice Me, lyrics by Rose, music by Ted Snyder (1906) 
 I Marched Around Again, lyrics by Rose, music by Ted Snyder (1907)
 Take a Car, lyrics by Rose, music by Ted Snyder (1908) 

Ted Snyder Company
 If You Cared For Me As I Cared for You, lyrics by Rose, music by Ted Snyder (1908)

Rose & Snyder Co. Incorporated, New York
 Don't Worry: It May Not All Be True, lyrics by Rose, music by Ted Snyder (1907) 
 What You Goin' to Tell Old St. Peter: When You Meet Him at the Golden Gate? lyrics & music by Rose (1908) 
 Some Heart is Sighing, lyrics and music by Rose (1908) 
 Honey Lou: The Suicide Song, lyrics by Rose, music by Tom Lemonier (1908) 
 Play Dat Rag, words by Rose & Dunston; music by Thomas Lemonier (1870–1945) (1908) 
 Move On Mr. Moon, lyrics by Rose, music by Ted Snyder (1908) 

F.A. Mills, 48 West 29 Street, New York City
 I'd Like To Have Your Photograph, lyrics by Rose, music by Kerry Mills, F.A. Mills (1909) 
 I'd Like To Be The Fellow That Girl is Waiting For, lyrics by Rose, music by Kerry Mills, F.A. Mills (1909) 

La Salle Music Publishers, Inc., Chicago
 Sooner or Later Your Heart Will Cry "I Want You," lyrics by Rose, music by Ted Snyder (1915) 
 If You've Got A Little Bit Hang On To It, It's Hard To Get a Little Bit More' lyrics by Rose, music by Ted Snyder (1915) 

McCarthy & Fisher, Inc.

 Good Gracious Annabelle, lyrics and music by Rose, George Whiting & Lew Pollack (1919) 
 Everybody Wants a Key to my Cellar, Rose, Billy Baskette, & Lew Pollack (1919) 
 Oh, Susie, Behave lyrics by Rose and music by Abe Olman (1918) 

Forster Music Publisher, Inc.
 Oh Johnny, Oh Johnny, Oh! lyrics by Rose, music by Abe Olman (1887–1984) (1917; 1944)
 Version with patriotic lyrics by Raymond A. Sherwood (1917) 
 Goodnight, Moonlight, lyrics by Rose, music by Frank Magine (1924) 

Milton Weil Music Co., Chicago
 Right After They Leave My Arms, lyrics & music by Rube Bennett, Ed Rose, & Billy Baskette (1927)

Joe Davis, Inc., New York (Joseph Morton Davis; 1896–1978)
 Carolina Lullaby, words and music by Cecelia Reeker (née Huenergardt; 1897–1981), Rose, & Billy Baskette (1933)

Family 
Ed's Brother, Eugene Smackels (1870–1939), was a singer, vaudevillian actor, and alumnus of Northwestern University.

References 

1875 births
1935 deaths
American lyricists
Songwriters from Illinois
Writers from Chicago
American music publishers (people)